Stephen William Warriner (born 18 December 1958) is an English former professional footballer. An attacking midfielder, Warriner joined Newport County in 1978 from Liverpool. Between 1978 and 1981 Warriner made 36 appearances for Newport, scoring 2 goals during the most successful period in the club's long history. Warriner was part of the team that won promotion and the Welsh Cup and in the subsequent season reached the quarter-final of the 1981 European Cup Winners Cup.

In 1981, he joined Rochdale and later played for Tranmere Rovers.

References

English footballers
Footballers from Liverpool
Liverpool F.C. players
Newport County A.F.C. players
Rochdale A.F.C. players
English Football League players
Living people
Tranmere Rovers F.C. players
Association football midfielders
1958 births